This is a list of American football players who have played for the Houston Texans in the National Football League (NFL).  It includes players that have played at least one game in the NFL regular season or postseason.  The Houston Texans franchise was founded in 2002.  The Texans yet to have a Super Bowl appearance.

 

Players in bold are members of the Pro Football Hall of Fame.

Players in italics are members of the team's Ring of Honor.

A

Oday Aboushi, RG (2015–2016)
Jeff Adams, LG (2014–2015)
Jerell Adams, TE (2019)
Mike Adams, FS (2019)
Tyrell Adams, ILB (2018–2020)
Jahleel Addae, SS (2019)
Xavier Adibi, OLB (2008–2010)
Jordan Akins, TE (2018–2021)
Mister Alexander, ILB (2011–2012)
Roc Alexander, KR (2006)
James Allen, RB (2002)
Jason Allen, CB (2010–2011)
Jeff Allen, RG (2016–2017)
Auzoyah Alufohai, NT (2020)
Danny Amendola, WR (2021)
Charlie Anderson, OLB (2004–2007)
David Anderson, WR (2006–2011)
Jason Anderson, RB (2005)
Mark Anderson, DE (2010)
Stephen Anderson, TE (2016–2017)
Bryan Anger, P (2019–2020)
Jason Ankrah, OLB (2014)
Cornell Armstrong, CB (2019–2020)
Derick Armstrong, WR (2003–2005)
Grayland Arnold, SS (2021–present)
Josh Aubrey, SS (2014)
Antony Auclair, TE (2021–present)
Thomas Austin, C (2011)

B

Jason Babin, DE (2004–2006)
Johnson Bademosi, CB (2018)
Alan Ball, CB (2012)
Lonnie Ballentine, FS (2015–2016)
Johnthan Banks, CB (2017)
Tony Banks, QB (2003–2005)
Dominique Barber, FS (2008–2011)
Shawn Barber, OLB (2007)
Connor Barwin, OLB (2009–2012)
Jarrod Baxter, FB (2002, 2004)
Evan Baylis, TE (2017)
Brad Bedell, LG (2006)
Jason Bell, CB (2002–2005)
Fred Bennett, CB (2007–2009)
Beau Benzschawel, G (2020)
Kevin Bentley, ILB (2008–2010)
Tony Bergstrom, C (2016)
Avion Black, RS (2002)
Jordan Black, LT (2007)
Ross Blacklock, DT (2020–present)
Angelo Blackson, DE (2017–2019)
Alfred Blue, RB (2014–2018)
Michael Boulware, SS (2007)
A. J. Bouye, CB (2013–2016)
Corey Bradford, WR (2002–2005)
Bryan Braman, OLB (2011–2013)
Mike Brisiel, RG (2007–2011)
Justin Britt, C (2021–present)
Brandon Brooks, RG (2012–2015)
Terrence Brooks, FS (2021–present)
Andrew Brown, DE (2020)
C. C. Brown, FS (2005–2008)
Duane Brown, LT (2008–2017)
Eric Brown, SS (2002–2004)
Kourtnei Brown, OLB (2015)
Kris Brown, K (2002–2009)
Milford Brown, LG (2003–2005)
Pharaoh Brown, TE (2020–present)
Ronnie Brown, RB (2014)
Keith Browner, DE (2014)
Mark Bruener, TE (2004–2008)
Phillip Buchanon, CB (2005–2006)
Randy Bullock, K (2013–2015)
Max Bullough, ILB (2014–2016)
Tim Bulman, DE (2007–2011)
Rex Burkhead, RB (2021–present)
Marcus Burley, CB (2017)
Curry Burns, FS (2003)
Deante Burton, CB (2018)
John Busing, SS (2009)
Rashad Butler, LT (2007, 2009–2011)
Jake Byrne, TE (2013)

C

Antoine Caldwell, RG (2009–2012)
Jalen Camp, WR (2021–present)
Ibraheim Campbell, SS (2017)
Khary Campbell, OLB (2009)
Marcus Cannon, RT (2021)
Roc Carmichael, CB (2012)
David Carr, QB (2002–2006)
Travis Carroll, OLB (2003)
Chris Carter, FS (2002)
DeAndre Carter, WR (2018–2020)
Ron'Dell Carter, DE (2021)
James Casey, FB (2009–2012)
Frank Chamberlin, OLB (2005)
Anthony Chesley, CB (2020)
Geron Christian, LT (2021)
Tyson Clabo, RT (2014)
Chris Clark, RT (2015–2017, 2019)
Danny Clark, OLB (2007)
Chunky Clements, NT (2017)
Charlie Clemons, OLB (2003)
Jadeveon Clowney, DE/OLB (2014–2018)
Tyler Clutts, FB (2012)
Sammie Coates, WR (2018)
Randall Cobb, WR (2020)
Earl Cochran, DE (2006–2008)
Shaun Cody, NT (2009–2012)
Dylan Cole, ILB (2017–2020)
Marcus Coleman, CB/FS (2002–2005)
Kevis Coley, MLB (2008)
Maliek Collins, DE (2021–present)
Nico Collins, WR (2021–present)
Aaron Colvin, CB (2018–2019)
Greg Comella, FB (2003)
Chris Conley, WR (2021–present)
Gareon Conley, CB (2019)
Jameel Cook, FB (2006–2007)
Brandin Cooks, WR (2020–present)
Isaiah Coulter, WR (2020)
Keke Coutee, WR (2018–2020)
Christian Covington, DE (2015–2018)
Curome Cox, SS (2007)
Xavier Crawford, CB (2019)
Jared Crick, DE (2012–2015)
Keion Crossen, CB (2019–2020)
Zach Cunningham, ILB (2017–2021)
Brian Cushing, ILB (2009–2017)

D

Lional Dalton, DT (2006)
Trevor Daniel, P (2018–2019)
B. J. Daniels, QB (2015)
Owen Daniels, TE (2006–2013)
Julién Davenport, LT (2017–2018)
André Davis, WR (2007–2009)
Davion Davis, WR (2021–present)
Domanick Davis, RB (2003–2005)
JaJuan Dawson, WR (2002)
Ron Dayne, RB (2006–2007)
Treston Decoud, CB (2017)
Jake Delhomme, QB (2011)
Jerry DeLoach, DE (2002–2005)
Quintin Demps, SS (2010–2012, 2015–2016)
Will Demps, FS (2007–2008)
Anthony Denham, TE (2014–2015)
Ryan Denney, DE (2010)
Pat Dennis, CB (2002)
Akeem Dent, ILB (2014–2016)
Dorin Dickerson, WR (2010)
Zac Diles, OLB (2007–2010, 2014)
K. J. Dillon, SS (2016)
Tim Dobbins, ILB (2011–2013)
Phillip Dorsett, WR (2021–present)
Char-ron Dorsey, RT (2002)
Joel Dreessen, TE (2008–2011)
Jeff Driskel, TE (2021–present)
Kurtis Drummond, SS (2015, 2017)
Brandon Dunn, DE (2015–2020)
Michael Dwumfour, DT (2021–present)

E

Glenn Earl, SS (2004–2006)
Dominik Eberle, K (2021)
Adimchinobe Echemandu, RB (2007)
Duke Ejiofor, OLB (2018)
Andre Ellington, RB (2017)
Bruce Ellington, WR (2017–2018)
Kyle Emanuel, OLB (2020)
Tyler Ervin, RB (2016–2018)
Troy Evans, OLB (2002–2006)

F

DeMarcus Faggins, CB (2002–2008)
Kaʻimi Fairbairn, K (2017–present)
Darren Fells, TE (2019–2020)
Nick Ferguson, SS (2008–2009)
C. J. Fiedorowicz, TE (2014–2017)
Mark Fields, CB (2020)
Ryan Fitzpatrick, QB (2014)
Mike Flanagan, C (2006–2007)
Jamar Fletcher, CB (2007)
Erik Flowers, OLB (2002)
Steve Foley, OLB (2003)
D'Onta Foreman, RB (2017–2018)
Jay Foreman, ILB (2002–2004)
Justin Forsett, RB (2012)
Arian Foster, RB (2009–2015)
Royce Freeman, RB (2021–present)
Kyle Fuller, RT (2017)
Will Fuller, WR (2016–2020)
Zach Fulton, RG (2018–2020)

G

Samkon Gado, RB (2006–2007)
Jabar Gaffney, WR (2002–2005)
Phillip Gaines, CB (2019–2020)
Andrew Gardner, LT (2011–2013)
Kevin Garrett, CB (2006)
Breno Giacomini, RT (2017)
Marcus Gilchrist, SS (2017)
Cullen Gillaspia, FB (2019–2020)
Tashaun Gipson, SS (2019)
Aaron Glenn, CB (2002–2004)
Tavares Gooden, ILB (2013)
DeMingo Graham, LG (2002)
Garrett Graham, TE (2010–2015)
Ray Graham, RB (2013)
Shayne Graham, K (2012)
Ahman Green, RB (2007–2008)
T. J. Green, FS (2021)
Jonathan Greenard, DE (2020–present)
Isaiah Greenhouse, MLB (2010)
Morlon Greenwood, OLB (2005–2008)
Ryan Griffin, TE (2013–2018)
Jonathan Grimes, RB (2012–2016)
Rex Grossman, QB (2009)
Kamu Grugier-Hill, MLB (2021–present)

H

Andre Hal, FS (2014–2018)
Nate Hall, OLB (2020)
P. J. Hall, DE (2020)
Cobi Hamilton, WR (2017)
Chad Hansen, WR (2020)
Vernon Hargreaves, CB (2019–2021)
Atnaf Harris, WR (2002)
Brandon Harris, CB (2011–2013)
Clark Harris, LS (2008)
Demone Harris, DE (2021–present)
Ryan Harris, RT (2012)
Brandon Harrison, SS (2008)
Brett Hartmann, P (2011)
Joel Heath, DE (2016–2019)
Charlie Heck, RT (2020–present)
Ben Heeney, ILB (2017)
Taylor Heinicke, QB (2017)
Seantrel Henderson, RT (2018–2019)
Jimmy Herndon, RT (2002)
Neville Hewitt, MLB (2021–present)
Anthony Hill, TE (2009)
Charles Hill, NT (2002)
Dontrell Hilliard, RB (2020)
Drew Hodgdon, C (2005–2007)
Trindon Holliday, RS (2011–2012)
Tony Hollings, RB (2003–2005)
Jabari Holloway, TE (2002–2003)
DeAndre Hopkins, WR (2013–2019)
Lamarr Houston, OLB (2017)
Tytus Howard, LG (2019–present)
Buddy Howell, RB (2018–2020)
Brian Hoyer, QB (2015)
Akeem Hunt, RB (2015–2016)
Von Hutchins, FS (2006–2007)
Carlos Hyde, RB (2019)

I

Mark Ingram II, RB (2021)
Junior Ioane, NT (2003–2005)

J

Kareem Jackson, CB (2010–2018)
Natrell Jamerson, FS (2018)
Bradie James, ILB (2012)
Charles James, CB (2015–2016)
Tim Jamison, DE (2009–2014)
Lestar Jean, WR (2012–2013)
Willie Jefferson, OLB (2013)
Darnell Jenkins, WR (2008)
Jelani Jenkins, ILB (2017)
Jordan Jenkins, OLB (2021–present)
Andre Johnson, WR (2003–2014)
Bryant Johnson, WR (2011)
Damaris Johnson, WR (2014)
David Johnson, RB (2020–2021)
Dennis Johnson, RB (2013)
Derrick Johnson, CB (2006)
Duke Johnson, RB (2019–2020)
Jaleel Johnson, DT (2021)
Kevin Johnson, CB (2015–2018)
Lonnie Johnson, CB (2019–2021)
Roderick Johnson, RT (2018–2020)
Thomas Johnson, DT (2006)
Travis Johnson, DT (2005–2008)
Cameron Johnston, P (2021–present)
Andy Jones, WR (2017)
Ben Jones, RG/LG/C (2012–2015)
Don Jones, SS (2016)
Donnie Jones, P (2012)
Greg Jones, FB (2013)
Jacoby Jones, WR (2007–2011)
Taiwan Jones, RB (2019)
Bennie Joppru, TE (2006)
Brevin Jordan, TE (2021–present)
Johnathan Joseph, CB (2011–2019)

K

Peter Kalambayi, OLB (2018–2020)
N. D. Kalu, DE (2006–2008)
Ufomba Kamalu, DE (2016–2017)
Deji Karim, RB (2013)
Case Keenum, QB (2013–2014)
Stanford Keglar, MLB (2010)
Senio Kelemete, LG (2018–2020)
Rashod Kent, TE (2003)
Shiloh Keo, FS (2011–2013)
William Kershaw, MLB (2007)
Cedric Killings, DT (2006–2007)
Desmond King, CB (2021–present)
Christian Kirksey, OLB (2021–present)

L

Jason Lamar, ILB (2002)
Kendall Lamm, RT (2015–2018)
Kendall Langford, DE (2017)
Vonta Leach, FB (2006–2010)
Shane Lechler, P (2013–2017)
Matt Leinart, QB (2011)
Damione Lewis, DT (2010)
Derrick Lewis, WR (2006)
Jermaine Lewis, RS (2002)
Kendrick Lewis, FS (2014)
LaTroy Lewis, OLB (2017)
Phillip Lindsay, RB (2021)
Corey Liuget, DE (2020)
Roy Lopez, DT (2021–present)
Jammal Lord, FS (2004)
Wali Lundy, RB (2006)

M

Elbert Mack, CB (2013–2014)
Stacey Mack, RB (2003)
Anthony Maddox, DT (2006–2007)
Jeff Maehl, WR (2011)
Alfred Malone, DE (2005–2006)
Ryan Malleck, TE (2017)
Ryan Mallett, QB (2014–2015)
Greg Mancz, C (2015–2020)
Danieal Manning, FS (2011–2014)
Roy Manning, MLB (2006)
Jacob Martin, OLB (2019–2021)
Keshawn Martin, WR (2012–2015)
Nick Martin, C (2017–2020)
Steve Martin, NT (2003)
Terrance Martin, DE (2003)
Glenn Martinez, WR (2009)
Derrick Mason, WR (2011)
Tyrann Mathieu, FS (2018)
Jerome Mathis, RS (2005–2007)
Joe Mays, ILB (2013)
Brice McCain, CB (2009–2013)
A. J. McCarron, QB (2019–2020)
Jimmy McClain, ILB (2002–2003)
Terrell McClain, NT (2012–2013)
Dexter McCleon, CB (2006)
Stanley McClover, DE (2008)
Justin McCray, RG (2021–present)
Marlon McCree, FS (2003–2004)
Sean McDermott, TE (2002)
Chris McKenzie, CB (2005)
Benardrick McKinney, ILB (2015–2020)
Steve McKinney, C (2002–2007)
Sherrick McManis, CB (2010–2011)
Whitney Mercilus, OLB (2012–2021)
Anthony Miller, WR (2021)
Billy Miller, TE (2002–2004)
Braxton Miller, WR (2016–2017)
Lamar Miller, RB (2016–2018)
Davis Mills, QB (2021–present)
Barkevious Mingo, OLB (2019)
Earl Mitchell, NT (2010–2013)
Keith Mitchell, OLB (2002)
Steven Mitchell, WR (2018–2020)
Terrance Mitchell, CB (2021)
Ryan Moats, RB (2008–2009)
Mike Mohamed, ILB (2014)
Antwaun Molden, CB (2008–2010)
Quincy Monk, ILB (2004)
A. J. Moore, SS (2018–2021)
Chris Moore, WR (2021–present)
Corey Moore, FS (2015–2017)
Rahim Moore, FS (2015)
Jimmy Moreland, CB (2021)
Vernand Morency, RB (2005–2006)
Donovan Morgan, WR (2005)
Darryl Morris, CB (2014–2015)
Jimmy Morrissey, C (2021–present)
J. J. Moses, RS (2003–2004)
Eric Moulds, WR (2006)
Keith Mumphery, WR (2015–2016)
Frank Murphy, WR (2002)
Matt Murphy, TE (2003–2005)
Eric Murray, FS (2020–present)
Chris Myers, C (2008–2014)

N

Jesse Nading, DE/OLB (2008–2012)
Robert Nelson, CB (2016)
Derek Newton, RT (2011–2016)
Hardy Nickerson, MLB (2021)
David Nixon, MLB (2010)
Troy Nolan, FS (2010–2012)
Moran Norris, FB (2002–2005)
Nick Novak, K (2015–2016)

O

Chris Ogbonnaya, RB (2011)
Adewale Ogunleye, DE (2010)
Frank Okam, DT (2008–2010)
Amobi Okoye, DT (2007–2010)
Charles Omenihu, DE (2019–2021)
Dan Orlovsky, QB (2010)
Shantee Orr, OLB (2003–2007)
Brock Osweiler, QB (2016)
Chad Overhauser, RG (2002)
Jonathan Owens, SS (2019–present)

P

Jeoffrey Pagan, DE (2014–2015)
Karl Paymah, CB (2010)
Seth Payne, NT (2002–2006)
Antwan Peek, OLB (2003–2006)
Brian Peters, ILB (2015–2018)
Scottie Phillips, RB (2020–2021)
Ryan Pickett, NT (2014)
Kevin Pierre-Louis, OLB (2021–present)
Bryan Pittman, LS (2003–2009)
Chester Pitts, LT/LG (2002–2009)
Eddie Pleasant, SS (2012–2017)
Chris Polk, RB (2015)
DaShon Polk, ILB (2004–2006)
Bernard Pollard, SS (2009–2010)
DeVier Posey, WR (2012–2014)
Jeff Posey, OLB (2002)
Jerrell Powe, NT (2014)
Gimel President, OLB (2017)
Jay Prosch, FB (2014–2017)
C. J. Prosise, RB (2020)
MyCole Pruitt, TE (2017)
Jeb Putzier, TE (2006-2007)

Q

David Quessenberry, LT (2017)
Paul Quessenberry, TE (2021–present)
Glover Quin, CB/SS (2009–2012)
Brent Qvale, RT (2020)

R

Neil Rackers, K (2010–2011)
Dave Ragone, QB (2003)
Greg Randall, RT (2003)
Martinas Rankin, LT (2018)
D. J. Reader, NT (2016–2019)
John Reid, CB (2020)
Justin Reid, SS (2018–2021)
Brooks Reed, OLB (2011–2014)
Ed Reed, SS (2013)
Jacques Reeves, CB (2008–2009)
Denzel Rice, CB (2016)
Victor Riley, LT (2005)
Derek Rivers, DE (2021–present)
Marcellus Rivers, TE (2005)
Andre Roberts, WR (2021)
DelJuan Robinson, DT (2008–2009)
Dunta Robinson, CB (2004–2009)
Bradley Roby, CB (2019–2020)
Justin Rogers, CB (2013)
Jumal Rolle, CB (2014–2015)
Sage Rosenfels, QB (2006–2008)
Stanford Routt, CB (2012)
Brian Russell, FS (2009)
Rod Rutledge, TE (2002)
Barrett Ruud, ILB (2012)
DeMeco Ryans, MLB (2006–2011)

S

Ephraim Salaam, LT (2006–2008, 2010)
Jaylen Samuels, RB (2021)
Lewis Sanders, CB (2005–2006)
Cecil Sapp, FB (2008)
Ricky Sapp, OLB (2013–2014)
Tom Savage, QB (2014, 2016–2017)
Brennan Scarlett, OLB (2016–2020)
Max Scharping, LG (2019–present)
Ryan Schau, RG (2002)
Matt Schaub, QB (2007–2013)
Guss Scott, SS (2006)
Corey Sears, DE (2002–2004)
Al-Hajj Shabazz, CB (2016)
David Sharpe, RT (2018)
Jamie Sharper, ILB (2002–2004)
Darryl Sharpton, ILB (2010–2013)
Edell Shepherd, WR (2006)
Cecil Shorts, WR (2015)
Jason Simmons, CB/SS (2002–2007)
John Simon, OLB (2014–2016)
Dan Skipper, RT (2019)
Chad Slade, RG (2017)
Steve Slaton, RB (2008–2011)
Jeremy Slechta, NT (2003)
Joey Slye, K (2021)
Brad Smelley, TE (2013)
Antonio Smith, DE (2009–2013, 2016)
Chris Smith, DE (2021)
D. J. Smith, ILB (2013)
Robaire Smith, DE (2004–2005)
Tremon Smith, CB (2021–present)
Vyncint Smith, WR (2018)
Wade Smith, LG (2010–2013)
Chad Spann, RB (2013)
Armegis Spearman, ILB (2003)
Marcus Spears, RT (2004)
Charles Spencer, LT (2006)
Cameron Spikes, LG (2002)
Ed Stansbury, RB (2002)
Chad Stanley, P (2002–2006)
Jawanza Starling, SS (2013)
Kendrick Starling, WR (2004)
Jordan Steckler, LT (2021–present)
Matt Stevens, FS (2002–2003)
Devon Still, DE (2016)
Kenny Stills, WR (2019–2020)
Michael Stone, CB (2006)
Connor Strachan, OLB (2021)
Jaelen Strong, WR (2015–2017)
Kasey Studdard, LG (2007–2010)
Xavier Su'a-Filo, LG (2014–2017)
Phillip Supernaw, TE (2013)
D. J. Swearinger, SS (2013–2014)

T

Jeff Tarpinian, ILB (2013–2014)
Ben Tate, RB (2011–2013)
Chris Taylor, RB (2006, 2008)
Lane Taylor, RG (2021)
Tyrod Taylor, QB (2021)
Vincent Taylor, DT (2021)
Demaryius Thomas, WR (2018)
Joe Thomas, MLB (2021)
Jordan Thomas, TE (2018–2019)
Michael Thomas, SS (2020)
Tavierre Thomas, CB (2021–present)
Carlos Thompson, OLB (2015)
Chaun Thompson, OLB (2008–2009)
Chris Thompson, WR (2017)
Jordan Todman, RS (2017)
Cole Toner, RG (2021)
Derrick Townsel, WR (2010)
Justin Tuggle, ILB (2013–2015)
Laremy Tunsil, LT (2019–present)
Matt Turk, P (2007–2011)
Mike Tyson, FS (2018)

V

Eddie Vanderdoes, DE (2019)
Darrick Vaughn, CB (2003)
Jordan Veasy, WR (2021)
Lawrence Vickers, FB (2011)
Josh Victorian, CB (2013)

W

Todd Wade, RT (2004–2005)
Darius Walker, RB (2007)
DeMarcus Walker, DE (2021)
Gary Walker, DE (2002–2005)
Josh Walker, RG (2016)
Ramon Walker, SS (2002–2003, 2005)
Jamar Wall, CB (2010)
Garret Wallow, OLB (2021–present)
Kevin Walter, WR (2006–2012)
Seth Wand, LT (2003–2005)
Derrick Ward, RB (2010–2011)
Kahale Warring, TE (2020)
Nate Washington, WR (2015)
Todd Washington, LG/C (2003–2005)
Carlos Watkins, DE (2017–2020)
Deshaun Watson, QB (2017–2020)
Josh Watson, MLB (2021)
J. J. Watt, DE (2011–2020)
Fred Weary, RG (2002–2007)
Anthony Weaver, DE (2006–2008)
Joe Webb, QB (2018)
Kayvon Webster, CB (2018)
Brandon Weeden, QB (2015, 2018)
Jon Weeks, LS (2010–present)
Jonathan Wells, RB (2002–2005)
Chris White, C/RG (2007–2009)
Cody White, G (2013)
DeAndrew White, WR (2017)
Zach Wiegert, RG/RT (2003–2006)
Vince Wilfork, NT (2015–2016)
Harry Williams, WR (2007)
Kevin Williams, FS (2002)
Marcus Williams, CB (2017)
Mario Williams, DE (2006–2011)
Torri Williams, FS (2010)
Wendall Williams, WR (2016)
Xavier Williams, DT (2021)
Eric Wilson, MLB (2021)
Eugene Wilson, FS (2008–2010)
Eric Winston, RT (2006–2011)
Kailee Wong, OLB (2002–2006)
Cierre Wood, RB (2013)
Chandler Worthy, WR (2015)
Kenny Wright, CB (2002–2004)
Shareece Wright, CB (2018)
Dexter Wynn, CB (2006–2007)

Y

T. J. Yates, QB (2011–2013, 2015, 2017)
Ryan Young, RT (2002)

Z

Jeff Zgonina, DT (2007–2009)

References

 

 
Houston
players